The Omega International Associates (Omega) is an international humanitarian organization dedicated to promoting peace.

About
Omega International Associates is a non-governmental humanitarian American–Brazilian organization registered with the Governments of the United States of America, Federative Republic of Brazil, Islamic Republic of Afghanistan, and the Republic of Tajikistan. The U.S. 501(c)(3) non-profit Organization functions as a resource-raising entity that fundraises for various humanitarian projects around the world with a current focus in Central Asia.
  
Omega International provides training and infrastructure programs to help transform people and nations to value peace and security.

Projects have been funded primarily by individual donors. Omega International's educational and skills development programs serve the least privileged people in the most remote regions of Central Asia including Afghanistan, Kazakhstan, Kyrgyzstan, Tajikistan, Turkmenistan, and Uzbekistan.
  
For centuries, teachers in Central Asian cultures have been highly respected and valued, wielding considerable influence in their communities. Women have traditionally been neither well-educated nor equipped to impact local economies. OI has strived to equip diverse societal groups with the ability to communicate effectively in - and to contribute intelligently to - familial, communal, and national interactions. OI has proven to be an important means to the enhancement of the stability of this critical region of the world.

In Afghanistan, Omega International has trained thousands of young persons and teachers. Omega International has equipped schools in Afghanistan with libraries and teacher training curricula.

Omega International is working to establish training centers throughout Asia, starting with the first in Dushanbe, Tajikistan. Each location is designed to be a self-sustaining social enterprise project creating empowerment centers.

Training centers

The Launch Training Centers offer empowerment training in Educational, Conversational and Market Place Language, Tourism and Hospitality, Soccer Coaching and Business Entrepreneurship to people by equipping them with new skills.
  
The Launch Training Centers are social enterprise projects. Once a project is financially sustainable, Omega International uses any profits from operations to provide grants, microcredits and microloans to promote new opportunities,  and ventures helping people throughout the region.

The Launch concept includes multiple approaches to address complex needs.  The project provides targeted (age and gender), tuition-based empowerment programs including:
 Tourism and Hospitality Industry Skills  
 Sports Player, Coach and Support Staff Skills
 Entrepreneurial Skills and Business Development  
 Educational, Conversational and Market Place Languages Skills in English, Russian, Chinese and German

Omega International brings individuals from across Central Asian nations and around the world to participate and share in The Launch.  The training programs are designed to provide people with the skills and knowledge necessary to start their own businesses in their homelands and is key to providing hope to the people of this region and helps repatriate displaced peoples.

GuideStar, a former information service specializing in reporting on U.S. nonprofit companies, awarded Omega International Associates the Bronze participation level through the GuideStar Exchange.

References

0501c